Pekel may refer to:

People
 Birol Pekel (1938–2004), Turkish football player
 Melike Pekel (born 1995), Turkish-German women's football player

Settlements
Pako, a settlement in the Municipality of Borovnica, formerly known as Pekel
Pekel, Maribor, a settlement in the Municipality of Maribor
Pekel, Trebnje, a settlement in the Municipality of Trebnje

Other
Hell Cave, known as Jama Pekel in Slovene
Hell Gorge, known as Soteska Pekel in Slovene
Pekel A, a river in Groningen
Pekel Grave, an unmarked Second World War grave